The 2017 Staffordshire County Council election took place on 4 May 2017 as part of 2017 local elections in the UK. All 62 councillors were elected from electoral divisions (two of which serve dual-councillor electoral divisions) for a four-year term of office.  The system used is first-past-the-post voting.

The result was Conservative councillors formed an increased majority on the council.

Results summary

|}

Division results for Cannock Chase District
Spoilt votes not included below.

Brereton & Ravenhill Division

Cannock Town Centre Division

Cannock Villages Division

Chadsmoor Division

Etchinghill & Heath Division

Hednesford & Rawnsley Division

Division results for East Staffordshire
Spoilt votes not included below.

Burton Tower Division

Burton Town Division

Burton Trent Division

Dove Division

Horninglow & Stretton Division

Needwood Forest Division

Uttoxeter Rural Division

Uttoxeter Town Division

Division results for Lichfield District
Spoilt votes not included below.

Burntwood North Division

Burntwood South Division

Lichfield City North Division

Lichfield City South Division

Lichfield Rural East Division

Lichfield Rural North Division

Lichfield Rural South Division

Lichfield Rural West Division

Division results for Borough of Newcastle-under-Lyme
Spoilt votes not included below.

Audley & Chesterton Division

Bradwell, Porthill & Wolstanton Division

Keele, Knutton & Silverdale Division

Kidsgrove Division

May Bank & Cross Heath Division

Newcastle Rural Division

Newcastle South Division

Talke & Red Street Division

Westlands & Thistleberry Division

Division results for South Staffordshire
Spoilt votes not included below.

Brewood Division

Cheslyn Hay, Essington & Great Wyrley Division

Codsall Division

Kinver Division

Penkridge Division

Perton Division

Wombourne Division

Division results for Borough of Stafford
Spoilt votes not included below.

Eccleshall Division

Gnosall & Doxey Division

Stafford Central Division

Stafford North Division

Stafford South East Division

Stafford Trent Valley Division

Stafford West Division

Stone Rural Division

Stone Urban Division

Division results for Staffordshire Moorlands
Spoilt votes not included below.

Biddulph North Division

Biddulph South & Endon Division

Caverswall Division

Cheadle & Checkley Division

Churnet Valley

Leek Rural

Leek South Division

Division results for Borough of Tamworth
Spoilt votes not included below.

Amington Division

Bolebridge Division

Perrycrofts Division

Stonydelph Division

Watling North Division

Watling South Division

References

2017
Staffordshire
2010s in Staffordshire